There were at least four important battles fought in the vicinity of Kock, Poland:
 Battle of Kock (1809) fought during the Napoleonic Wars
 Battle of Kock (1920) fought during the Polish–Soviet War
 Battle of Kock (1939) during the German invasion of Poland
 Battle of Kock (1944) fought during Operation Tempest (World War II)